Hana Sitnianská-Mičechová (25 January 1946, Prague – 11 December 2020, Prague) was a Czech rhythmic gymnast. She was the 1965 World individual all-around Champion.

Biography 
Mičechová was born in Prague. At the 1965 World Championships, with 12 countries competing, she competed in front of a home crowd in Prague and won the All-around and Apparatus events, beating Soviets Ludmila Savinkova and Tatiana Kravtchenko.

References

External links

Hana Sitnianska at the-sports.org

1946 births
2020 deaths
Czech rhythmic gymnasts
Gymnasts from Prague
Medalists at the Rhythmic Gymnastics World Championships